This is a list of members of the Tasmanian House of Assembly between the 1882 elections and the 1886 election.

Notes
 The affiliations listed are as reported in The Mercury on 3 June 1882.
 At the 1882 election, George Keach, the member for Campbell Town, was re-elected, but was declared not to have been duly elected. William Brown won a subsequent by-election on 28 July 1882.
 On 1 December 1882, one of the two members for Kingborough, Christopher O'Reilly, resigned. Richard Lucas won the resulting by-election on 20 January 1883.
 On 15 August 1884, Sir Adye Douglas, the member for Fingal, became Premier and Chief Secretary. As such he was required to resign and contest a ministerial by-election, however he opted to contest the recently vacated Legislative Council division of South Esk, which he won on 21 August 1884. At the close of nominations on 27 August 1884 for the by-election called to select his successor in Fingal, John Davies was elected unopposed.
 Two other members were required to resign on 15 August 1884 and contest ministerial by-elections; they were both re-elected unopposed a week later.
 On 15 October 1884, the member for South Launceston, James Scott, died. William Hartnoll won the resulting by-election on 12 November 1884.
 In February 1885, the member for Selby, Charles Grubb, resigned. William Sidebottom won the resulting by-election on 25 February 1885.
 On 11 February 1885, the member for Wellington and former Premier William Giblin resigned. James Norton Smith won the resulting by-election on 2 March 1885.
 In July 1885, the member for Richmond, William Brock, resigned. George Stokell won the resulting by-election on 1 August 1885.
 On 22 August 1885, the member for Brighton, Henry Butler, died. Alfred Lord won the resulting by-election on 16 September 1885.
 In December 1885, the member for Central Launceston, William Hart, resigned to contest the Legislative Council division of Launceston, which he won on 21 December 1885. No election was held to replace him and the Assembly seat was abolished at the following election.

Sources
 Parliament of Tasmania (2006). The Parliament of Tasmania from 1856

Members of Tasmanian parliaments by term
19th-century Australian politicians